Turkish tobacco, or Oriental tobacco, is a small-leafed variety of tobacco which is sun-cured. 
Turkish tobacco plants usually have a greater number and smaller size leaves. These differences can be attributed to climate, soil, cultivation and treatment methods.
Historically, it was cultivated primarily in Thrace and Macedonia, now divided among Bulgaria, Greece, North Macedonia and Turkey, but it is now also grown on the Black Sea coast of Turkey, in Egypt, in South Africa and elsewhere.

The name "Turkish" refers to the Ottoman Empire, which ruled the historic production areas until the late 19th/early 20th century.

History 

Tobacco originated in the Americas and was introduced to the Ottoman Turks by the Spanish. The Ottoman people over time developed their own method of growing and using tobacco.

Many of the early brands of cigarettes were made mostly or entirely of Turkish tobacco; today, its main use is in blends of pipe and especially cigarette tobacco.

Turkish tobacco is more suitable for cigarette production.

In the early 1900s, manufactures of Turkish and Egyptian cigarettes tripled their sales and became legitimate competitors to leading brands. The New York-based Greek tobacconist Soterios Anargyros
produced the hand-rolled Murad cigarettes, made of pure Turkish tobacco.

One of the most over-the-top ad campaigns for any cigarette was the long-running series for Murad brand made by Rea Irvin.

Tastes in Europe and the United States shifted away from Turkish tobacco and towards Virginia tobacco, during and after the First World War.

Cigarettes containing Turkish tobacco (which includes those varieties grown in what is now Greece) exclusively continued to be manufactured and sold as "Turkish cigarettes" in the US (brands Murad, Helmar, Fatima and others), the UK (Sullivan & Powell, Benson & Hedges, Fribourg & Treyer, Balkan Sobranie) and Germany (where the so-called "Orientzigaretten" had the major market share before the Second World War)

But they are not available anymore, and many brands, like Murad, disappeared.

Turkish tobacco in American blends 

Today, Turkish tobacco is a key ingredient in American blend cigarettes (Virginia, Burley, Turkish) introduced with Camels in 1913.

Demand for Oriental tobacco remains high. But despite high demand, the capacity to grow oriental tobacco remains limited. Oriental tobacco is one of the most expensive types of tobacco in cigarette blends. It's the reason why most American-style cigarettes are now a blend of Virginia tobacco and White Burley tobacco.

See also
 Camel (cigarettes)
 Types of tobacco
 Egyptian cigarette industry
 Latakia (tobacco)

Notes

 
Smoking